Reigate College is a state college in Reigate, Surrey, England, for students aged 16–19. The college occupies part of the town centre between the High Street and railway station.

Reigate College was graded by Ofsted as "Outstanding" in 2008.

Curriculum

The college offers predominantly GCE AS/A level and BTEC two-year courses, with provision for students to enrol on an Intermediate Programme (pre- A Level) and GCSE re-sit courses.

Feeder schools

Recruiting or drawing from up to 100 state and independent schools each year, the college serves as a dedicated sixth form to four partner schools: Oakwood School, Reigate School, Carrington School and de Stafford School

Visual arts

The Visual Arts Centre came into use in September 2002 and was formally opened by Dame Judi Dench in May 2003.

Independent learning centres (ILCs) 

The main ILC is located in the new Independent Learning centre building, on the ground and first floor.With wheelchair access by lift. It contains the library as well as a computer suite.
Students can find books using the catalogue, which also tells students whether the book is available or out on loan.

Notable alumni

Norman Cook, musician (also known as Fatboy Slim)
Guy and Howard Lawrence, of Disclosure
Jessie Mei Li, actress 
Michael Greco, actor
Natasha Desborough, author and radio personality
Faye White, former England football captain
Jake Roche, singer and former actor (a part of Push Baby)
Ethan Pinnock, footballer
Dan Noble, Radio Presenter

References

External links
School website

Learning and Skills Beacons
Sixth form colleges in Surrey
Reigate and Banstead
Reigate